Aghchorguitt  is a town and commune in the Brakna Region of southern-western Mauritania.

In 2000 it had a population of 9,188.

Notable people
Ahmed Ould Daddah

References

Communes of Brakna Region